The Hoeam Line is a  non-electrified secondary line of the Korean State Railway in Kyŏnghŭng County, North Hamgyŏng province, North Korea, running from Haksong on the Hambuk Line to Obong.

History
After the Chosen Synthetic Oil Company opened a large factory in Aoji-ri (now Haksong-ri) in 1937 to produce synthetic oil from the bituminous coal mined in the area, the Chosen Coal Industry Company built a railway line, called the Ao Line, to connect its mines to the chemical factory and to the South Manchuria Railway's North Chosen East Line, opening the first  section from Aoji to Hoeam for passenger and freight service on 9 September 1938. The line was then extended, with a new  section from Hoeam to Sinaoji (now called Ŭndŏk) and Obong opened on 14 September 1942.

Following the partition of Korea, the entirety of the Ao Line was located in the Soviet zone of occupation. The Provisional People’s Committee for North Korea nationalised all railways in the northern half of the country on 10 August 1946, and following the establishment of North Korea, the Korean State Railway was created. After the town of Aoji was renamed to Haksong, the line was given its current name.

Route

A yellow background in the "Distance" box indicates that section of the line is not electrified.

References

Railway lines in North Korea
Standard gauge railways in North Korea